The Panhellenic Federation of Journalists' Unions (Poesy)  (Π.Ο.Ε.ΣΥ.) is a Greek trade union federation of journalists' unions.

It was founded on 12 October 1994 in Athens by 25 representatives from the following five journalist unions:

 Journalists' Union of the Athens Daily Newspapers
 Journalists' Union of Macedonia and Thrace Daily Newspapers
 Journalists' Union of the Peloponnese, Epirus and the Islands
 Journalists' Union of the Daily Newspapers of Thessaly, Central Greece and Euboea
 Periodical and Electronic Press Union

It is a member of the European Federation of Journalists and the International Federation of Journalists.

See also

Trade unions in Greece

External links
 Website

International Federation of Journalists
Trade unions in Greece
Trade unions established in 1994
Journalists' trade unions
Greek journalism organizations